According to Northern Paiute oral history, the Si-Te-Cah, Saiduka or Sai'i are a legendary tribe whose mummified remains were allegedly discovered under four feet of guano by guano miners in what is now known as Lovelock Cave near Lovelock, Nevada, United States. 

Although the cave had been mined since 1911, miners did not notify authorities until 1912. The miners destroyed many of the artifacts, but archaeologists were still able to retrieve 10,000 Northern Paiute artifacts from the cave. Items included tule duck decoys, giant sandals, and baskets, several dating back over 2,000 years.

Name
"Si-Te-Cah" means "tule-eaters"  in the Northern Paiute language. Tule or Schoenoplectus acutus is a fibrous water plant. In order to escape harassment from the Paiutes, the Si-Te-Cahs were said to have lived on rafts made of tule on the lake.

Oral history
According to the Northern Paiutes, the Si-Te-Cah were a red-haired band of cannibals. The Si-Te-Cah and the Paiutes were at war, and after a long struggle a coalition of tribes trapped the remaining Si-Te-Cah in Lovelock Cave. When they refused to come out, the Paiutes piled brush before the cave mouth and set it aflame. The Si-Te-Cah were annihilated.

Sarah Winnemucca, daughter of Paiute Chief Winnemucca, wrote about what she described as "a small tribe of barbarians" who ate her people in her book Life Among the Paiutes: Their Wrongs and Claims. She wrote that "after my people had killed them all, the people round us called us Say-do-carah. It means conqueror; it also means 'enemy.' My people say that the tribe we exterminated had reddish hair. I have some of their hair, which has been handed down from father to son. I have a dress which has been in our family a great many years, trimmed with the reddish hair. I am going to wear it some time when I lecture. It is called a mourning dress, and no one has such a dress but my family." Winnemucca does not mention giants.

Folk stories 
Adrienne Mayor writes about the Si-Te-Cah in her book Fossil Legends of the First Americans. She suggests that the "giant" interpretation of the skeletons from Lovelock Cave and other dry caves in Nevada was started by entrepreneurs setting up tourist displays and that the skeletons themselves were of normal size. However, about a 100 miles north of Lovelock there are plentiful fossils of mammoths and cave bears, and their large limbed bones could easily be thought to be those of giants by an untrained observer. She also discusses the reddish hair, pointing out that hair pigment is not stable after death and that various factors such as temperature, soil, etc. can turn ancient very dark hair rusty red or orange. Another explanation for the "giant" interpretation of the skeletons may also come from the fact that the first remains unearthed by the guano miners in 1911–12, those of a man, were described as "giant" in comparison to the much smaller apparently female skeletons.

A written report by James H. Hart, the first of two miners to excavate the cave in the fall of 1911, recalls that in the north-central part of the cave, about four feet deep, "was a striking looking body of a man 'six feet six inches tall.' His body was mummified and his hair distinctly red." Unfortunately in the first year of mining, some of the human remains and artifacts were lost and destroyed. "The best specimen of the adult mummies was boiled and destroyed by a local fraternal lodge, which wanted the skeleton for initiation purposes." Also, several of the fiber sandals found in the cave were remarkably large, and one reported at over 15 inches (38 cm) in length was said to be on display at the Nevada Historical Society's museum in Reno in 1952.

The Paiute tradition asserts that the Si-Te-Cah people practiced cannibalism, and this may have had some basis in fact. During the 1924 excavation of the cave, a series of three human bones were found near the surface towards the mouth of the cave. "These had been split to extract the marrow, as animal bones were split, and probably indicate cannibalism during a famine".

Notes

References
 
 Hopkins, Sarah Winnemucca. 'Life Among the Piutes: Their Wrongs and Claims' .  Boston Stereotype Foundry, 1882.

External links
 Adrienne Mayor's homepage
 Stone Mother, a Paiute Legend
 Paiute Legends and Stories
 Lovelock Culture
 

Native American history of Nevada
Northern Paiute
Pre-statehood history of Nevada
Native American giants